Halls Gap Zoo is a country  zoo located about  from Halls Gap, Victoria, Australia. From the zoo you can see Grampians National Park. It is Victoria's largest regional zoo, holding well over 160 native and exotic species.

History
Halls Gap Zoo was originally opened in the early 1980s as Wallaroo Wildlife Park. The new owners in 1998 opened the gates as the Halls Gap Wildlife Park & Zoo. It was sold to the current owners in December 2007 and is now operating as the Halls Gap Zoo.

The zoo opened a new nocturnal house in 2008, along with a wetlands area for waterfowl.

Animals
The Zoo has a mixture of about 160 native and exotic species. The native animals at the zoo include: koalas, kangaroos, emus, wombats, dingoes and wallabies. Exotic animals at the zoo include: bison, monkeys, deer, giraffes, ostriches and cheetahs. There are also a variety of reptiles (including saltwater crocodiles) and birds at the zoo.

Birds

 African firefinch
 Australian wood duck
 Black swan
 Black-faced woodswallow
 Black-winged stilt
 Blue peafowl
 Blue-and-gold macaw
 Brolga
 Budgerigar
 Bush stone-curlew
 Canada goose
 Cape Barren goose
 Common ostrich
 Crimson rosella
 Crimson-bellied conure
 Domestic turkey
 Dusky lory
 Eastern barn owl
 Eclectus parrot
 Egyptian goose
 Emu
 Galah
 Green-winged macaw
 Helmeted guineafowl
 Long-billed corella
 Major Mitchell's cockatoo
 Namaqua dove
 Orange-bellied parrot
 Orange-breasted waxbill
 Pacific black duck
 Princess parrot
 Rainbow lorikeet
 Red junglefowl
 Red bishop weaver
 Red-tailed black cockatoo
 Rose-crowned fruit dove
 Southern boobook
 Southern cassowary
 St Helena waxbill
 Sulphur-crested cockatoo
 Sun conure
 Superb parrot
 Tawny frogmouth
 Turquoise-fronted amazon
 Wedge-tailed eagle
 White-browed woodswallow
 White-tailed black cockatoo
 Yellow-tailed black cockatoo

Mammals

 American bison
 Barbary sheep
 Black flying fox
 Black-and-white ruffed lemur
 Black-capped capuchin monkey
 Black-handed spider monkey
 Brush-tailed rock wallaby
 Cheetah
 Common brushtail possum
 Common wombat
 Cotton-top tamarin
 Dingo
 Elk
 European fallow deer
 Fat-tailed dunnart
 Feathertail glider
 Fennec fox
 Giraffe
 Golden lion tamarin
 Greater bilby
 Himalayan tahr
 Indian hog deer
 Koala
 Meerkat
 Plains rat
 Pygmy marmoset
 Quokka
 Red panda
 Red-necked wallaby
 Red-tailed phascogale
 Ring-tailed lemur
 Serval
 Short-beaked echidna
 Southern brown bandicoot
 Spinifex hopping mouse
 Southern white rhinoceros
 Spotted-tailed quoll
 Sugar glider
 Swamp wallaby
 Tammar wallaby
 Tasmanian devil
 Western grey kangaroo
 White-tufted marmoset
 Woylie
 Yellow-footed rock wallaby

The zoo also keeps several domestic mammals: alpacas, goats, pigs, ponies, sheep, guinea pigs and Texas longhorn cattle.

Reptiles

 American alligator
 Banded rock python
 Black-headed python
 Blotched blue-tongued lizard
 Boa constrictor
 Boyd's forest dragon
 Burmese python
 Central bearded dragon
 Central netted dragon
 Cunningham's spiny-tailed skink
 Diamond python
 Eastern blue-tongued lizard
 Eastern water dragon
 Gila monster
 Green iguana
 Indian star tortoise
 Lace monitor
 Merten's water monitor
 Northern blue-tongued lizard
 Perentie
 Pig-nosed turtle
 Ridge-tailed monitor
 Rosenberg's monitor
 Saltwater crocodile
 Shingleback lizard
 Tiger snake
 Veiled chameleon

References

External links

1981 establishments in Australia
Zoos established in 1981
Zoos in Victoria (Australia)
Tourist attractions in Victoria (Australia)
Grampians (region)